Mohammad Abdul Mannan (1950 – 28 April 2022)  was a Bangladesh Nationalist Party politician. He was the first elected city mayor of Gazipur City Corporation of Bangladesh. Before that he served as the religious affairs minister of Bangladesh from 1991 to 1993. He also served as the minister of science and technology from 1993 to 1995.

Career
Mannan was elected Gazipur City Corporation mayor in July 2013 and assumed office in August. In February 2015, police arrested him for his suspected involvement in an arson attack on a bus in Gazipur in February the same year. The next month, panel mayor, local Awami League leader Asadur Rahman Kiron, who was elected a ward councillor, was made acting mayor upon a court directive. Mannan was released from jail in March 2016. He was arrested again in April the same year and released in January 2017. He rejoined the office in June 2017 but Local Government Division (LGD) suspended him for the third time on 6 July 2017.

References

1950 births
2022 deaths
People from Gazipur District
Bangladesh Nationalist Party politicians
5th Jatiya Sangsad members
State Ministers of Religious Affairs (Bangladesh)
Mayors of Gazipur
Mukti Bahini personnel